This is a list of Italian television related events from 2021.

Events 

 6 March: The pop rock band Måneskin win the 2021 edition of Sanremo.
 25 March: Stefano Bronzato wins the eleventh season of Italia's Got Talent.
 1 May: Concerto del Primo Maggio May Day rock concert broadcast live on Rai 3.
22 May: Italy, represented in 2021 by the Måneskin, wins the Eurovision Song Contest 2021 in Rotterdam, Amsterdam.

Debuts

Rai 

 A grande richiesta, a television musical variety aired in the early evening of Saturday, on Rai 1.
 Canzone segreta, a television program broadcast on Rai 1.The program is the Italian adaptation of the French program La Chanson Secrète.
Ciao Maschio, a television program, broadcast on Rai 1.
Game of Games - Gioco Loco, a game show genre television program broadcast on Rai 2.
La musica che gira intorno, a television variety music broadcast in prime time on Rai 1.
 La caserma, a docu-reality television program, broadcast in prime time on Rai 2.
Domani è domenica, a talk show television program, broadcast on Rai 2.
Ti sento, a television program broadcast on Rai 2.
Magazzini musicali, a musical program broadcast on Rai 2 and replicated on Rai Radio 2 and Rai 4.
Via dei Matti n°0, a musical television program broadcast on Rai 3.

Mediaset 
Felicissima sera, a variety and entertainment television program, broadcast on Canale 5.
Zona bianca, a talk show, political and rotogravure television program, broadcast on Rete 4.
Salotto Salemi, a program on the internet platform broadcast on the Mediaset Play portal.

Netflix 

 Fate: The Winx Saga, a teen drama series based on the Nickelodeon animated series Winx Club, created by Iginio Straffi.

Prime Video 

 LOL - Chi ride è fuori, a comedy show based on the LOL format.

Sky 

 In compagnia del lupo - Il cuore nero delle fiabe, a television program conducted by Carlo Lucarelli, broadcast on the Sky Arte channel.
Crimini da copertina, a documentary television program broadcast on TV8.
Scemi da matrimonio, a television program broadcast on TV8.

Discovery 

 Bake Off Italia - Dolci sotto un tetto, the Italian edition of Bake Off, aired on Real Time.
Micromostri con Barbascura X, a television program broadcast on DMAX.

Television shows

1990s 

 Le Iene (1997–present)

2000s 

Grande Fratello (2000–present)
C'è posta per te (2000–present)
Amici di Maria De Filippi (2001–present)
 Otto e mezzo (2002–present)
L'isola dei famosi (2003–present)
 Ballando con le stelle (2005–present)
 X Factor (2008–present)

2010s 

 Italia's Got Talent (2010–present)
 Temptation Island (2014–present)
 Dimartedì  (2014–present)

2020s 
 Il cantante mascherato (2020–present)
 Top Dieci (2020–present)

Ending this year 

 Ricette all'italiana (2010–2021), a tourist and cooking television program broadcast on Rete 4.
 Viaggio nella grande bellezza (2019–2021), a documentary television program broadcast on Canale 5.

Births

Deaths

References 

2021 in Italian television